Cégep de Thetford is a College of general and vocational education (CEGEP) in Thetford Mines, Quebec, Canada. It is located at 671 boulevard Frontenac Ouest. It was established in 1969.

The Cégep de Thetford welcomes international students through various programs. These students come from a dozen different countries, including France.

Five residences are located in the vicinity of the Cégep de Thetford, offering more than 130 students the opportunity to live there.

The Cégep also offers six programs of study in the Lotbinière region, thanks to its Centre d'études collégiales located in Saint-Agapit.

External links
Cégep de Thetford

References 

Quebec CEGEP
Education in Chaudière-Appalaches
Thetford Mines
Buildings and structures in Chaudière-Appalaches
Educational institutions established in 1969
1969 establishments in Quebec